Yang In-deok (Korean:양인덕) is a South Korean taekwondo practitioner. 

She won a gold medal in middleweight at the 1991 World Taekwondo Championships in Athens, after defeating Chavela Aaron in the final.

References

External links

Year of birth missing (living people)
Living people
South Korean female taekwondo practitioners
World Taekwondo Championships medalists
20th-century South Korean women